The Kolsky basic model and modified model for attenuation and dispersion is the mathematical Q models that is most used in seismic applications. The basic Kolsky model is used for its simplicity in seismic data processing, however it does not rigorously satisfy the Minimum phase criterion and cannot satisfy the Kramers–Kronig relations. But then the Kolsky's modified model comes to our rescue, producing an accurate representation of the velocity dispersion within the seismic frequency band. The basic Kolsky model is presented in Kolsky's book "Stress waves in solids" that are available as a Google book."Stress waves in Solids".(1963 edition)
Kolsky's modified model is presented in Wang's book Seismic inverse Q filtering. This book is also available as a Google book:Seismic inverse Q filtering (2008),

Basic 
The theoretical background for mathematical Q models can be found in the Wikipedia article: Mathematical Q models. Here we found a function K(w) we can call a propagation constant in line with Futterman.

k(w) can be linked to the phase velocity of the seismic wave with the formula:

To obtain a solution that can be applied to seismic k(w) must be connected to a function that represent the way the seismic wave propagates in the seismic media. This functions can be regarded as a Q-model.

In his outline Wang calls the Kolsky-Futterman model the Kolsky model. The model assumes the attenuation α(w) to be strictly linear with frequency over the range of measurement:

And defines the phase velocity as:

Where cr and Qr   are the phase velocity and the Q value at a reference frequency wr.

For a large value of Qr >>1 the solution (1.6) can be approximated to

where

Kolsky’s model was derived from and fitted well with experimental observations. A requirement in the theory for materials satisfying the linear attenuation assumption is that the reference frequency wr is a finite (arbitrarily small but nonzero) cut-off on the absorption. According to Kolsky, we are free to choose wr following the phenomenological criterion that it be small compared with the lowest measured frequency w in the frequency band. Those who want a deeper insight into this concept can go to Futterman (1962)

Computations

Bjørn Ursin and Tommy Toverud  published an article where they compared different Q models. They used the Kolsky model as a reference model.

For each of the Q models Ursin B. and Toverud T. presented in their article they computed the attenuation (1.5) and phase velocity (1.6) in the frequency band 0–300 Hz. Fig.1. presents the graph for the Kolsky model - attenuation (left) and phase velocity (right) with cr=2000 m/s, Qr=100 and wr=2π100 Hz.

If we change the value for wr to a much lower value 2π0.01 Hz, we will get a higher phase velocity for all frequencies:

Modification to the Kolsky model 

The choice of wr as the lowest frequency in the frequency band will introduce phase errors when we use the Kolsky model as an inverse Q filter. This is very well documented in Wang (2008). So the phase velocity formula in the basic Kolsky model is modified by using the highest frequency wh as a reference. It could very well be the same as was used by Bjørn Ursin and Tommy Toverud above, wh=2π100. Hz Then we can get a correct solution with inverse Q filtering with the Kolsky model.

Notes

References

Seismology measurement
Geophysics